Blue Cat Blues is a 1956 one-reel animated Tom and Jerry cartoon and was written, directed and produced by co-creators William Hanna and Joseph Barbera. The short was released by Metro-Goldwyn-Mayer on November 16, 1956 in CinemaScope. It is the series' 103rd entry.

Unusual for a Tom and Jerry cartoon, Jerry "speaks," through an inner monologue, voiced by Paul Frees.

Plot
Tom is seen sitting on train tracks, heavily depressed and waiting for an oncoming train to come and run him over, while Jerry laments at his friend's state and recalls how he ended up there. Jerry narrates that he and Tom were best friends before Tom falls for a beautiful white cat who, at first, seems to return his feelings (though she is actually manipulating him to her whims) before leaving him for Butch (who, unlike in other cartoons, is extremely rich), revealing she is actually a gold digger, confirming Jerry's earlier suspicions. Despite Jerry's protests, Tom desperately tries to buy back her love, but is continually outdone by Butch. When Tom tries to present her with a flower, he finds she has had already received a beautiful horseshoe garland of roses from Butch. He then presents her with a small bottle of perfume, but then Butch arrives with a large tanker truck full of perfume. Tom squanders all of his life savings to buy a diamond ring for her (with a diamond so small she needs a magnifying glass to see it) only to learn that Butch has had already gifted her a ring with a large diamond so shiny that she and Tom don welding helmets just to see it. He even sells himself into slavery just to buy her an old, rickety automobile, only for Butch to arrive in his long train-like convertible, crushing Tom and his car. Tom starts drinking (milk) uncontrollably, ignoring Jerry's pleas, and eventually nearly goes down the literal gutter, but is saved just in time by Jerry. Tom becomes even more depressed when Butch and the white cat drive by in the limousine with a "JUST MARRIED" sign on the back. As the flashback ends, Jerry kisses a picture of his girlfriend before she drives past, having married to a rich mouse. Heartbroken, Jerry meets Tom and joins him on the tracks. The whistle of an approaching train grows louder as the cartoon fades out.

Availability
 LaserDisc: The Art of Tom & Jerry Vol. 2, Disc Four
 VHS: Tom and Jerry: Festival of Fun
 DVD:
Tom and Jerry's Greatest Chases Vol. 3
 Tom and Jerry Spotlight Collection Vol. 1, Disc Two
 Tom and Jerry: The Classic Collection Vol. 4, Disc Two (Vol. 8 in Europe and Australia) (Europe 1995 Turner dubbed version and pan-and-scan edition)
 Tom and Jerry: No Mice Allowed!
iTunes:
Tom & Jerry and Friends Vol. 1
Tom and Jerry Vol. 1
Tom and Jerry: Wild Cats and Traps

Additionally, the soundtrack was officially released on Tom and Jerry & Tex Avery Too! album.

Reception

Critical response
In Cartoon Carnival: A Critical Guide to Best Cartoons, writer Michael Samerdyke said "Blue Cat Blues is deeply indebted to Tex Avery for its gags." Video Movie Guide: 1995 called the short (in a review for the aforementioned Festival of Fun VHS) said "among the worst Tom & Jerry outings".

Legacy
The short is often considered the darkest Tom and Jerry cartoon due to its subject matter and unusually dark ending.

Additionally, it is often confused to be the final short of the series due to its ending implying the deaths of Tom and Jerry. The final short produced at Metro-Goldwyn-Mayer was Tot Watchers in 1958, and the final short overall was Purr-Chance to Dream, produced by Chuck Jones at Sib Tower 12 in 1967.

Notes

References

External links

1956 short films
1956 animated films
1950s American animated films
CinemaScope films
Films scored by Scott Bradley
Metro-Goldwyn-Mayer animated short films
Metro-Goldwyn-Mayer short films
Short films directed by Joseph Barbera
Short films directed by William Hanna
Tom and Jerry short films
Metro-Goldwyn-Mayer cartoon studio short films
Films about suicide
1950s English-language films
American animated short films
Animated films about cats
Animated films about mice
American drama short films